Dannielle Brent, (born 19 September 1979) also known as Danielle Brent is a British actress best known for her roles on Hollyoaks as Gina Patrick and  Natalie Buxton in Bad Girls.

Early life
Brent was accepted into the Italia Conti Academy of Theatre Arts. When she was 15, Brent performed in the Children's Royal Variety Show and wanted to become a musical performer, however she soon changed her mind and wanted to become an actress.

Career
Brent began her acting career when she was 18 by landing a part as lesbian eco-warrior Gina Patrick in Hollyoaks. Since then, Brent has starred in Dream Team as Jennifer Taylor, One Man and His Dog as Danielle, Casualty as Sharon Court and in Bad Girls. It was through Bad Girls she became more known. She played Series 6, 7 and 8's biggest bitch, as psychopathic Top Dog Natalie Buxton who was killed by rival Pat Kerrigan (Liz May Brice).

Brent has also appeared in many magazines, such as Bliss, Sugar, Top of the Pops, Smash Hits, FHM and many more.

In June 2011, Brent also played Willa in Big Finish Productions, Doctor Who audio drama Animal. In 2014, Brent appeared in Top Dog.

Personal life
In March 2012, Brent gave birth to her daughter, her first child.

Filmography

References

External links

 DannielleBrent.com
 ITV Bad Girls

Living people
1979 births
Alumni of the Italia Conti Academy of Theatre Arts
21st-century English actresses
Actresses from London
English television actresses
English film actresses
English soap opera actresses
People from Rush Green, London
20th-century English actresses